Marshall Township is one of fifteen townships in Clark County, Illinois, USA.  As of the 2010 census, its population was 4,574 and it contained 2,153 housing units.

Geography

Cities, towns, villages
 Marshall (west three-quarters)

Unincorporated towns
 Oakcrest
(This list is based on USGS data and may include former settlements.)

Cemeteries
The township contains these four cemeteries: Marshall, Marshall City, Mitchell and Saint Marys.

Major highways
  Interstate 70
  U.S. Route 40
  Illinois Route 1

Landmarks
 Lincoln Trail State Park (north quarter)

Demographics

School districts
 Marshall Community Unit School District #C-2

Political districts
 Illinois' 15th congressional district
 State House District 110
 State Senate District 55

Sources
 Perrin, William Henry, ed.. History of Crawford and Clark Counties, Illinois Chicago, Illinois. O. L. Baskin & Co. (1883).

.

References
 
 United States Census Bureau 2007 TIGER/Line Shapefiles
 United States National Atlas

External links
 City-Data.com
 Illinois State Archives

Townships in Clark County, Illinois
Townships in Illinois